Batamori is a town, and one of twenty union councils in Battagram District of Khyber-Pakhtunkhwa province of Pakistan.

References

Darululoom Al-Islamiyah Batamori

Union councils of Battagram District